Daltro Menezes (born 18 January 1938 in Porto Alegre, died 18 August 1994 in Porto Alegre) was a Brazilian professional football manager.

He coached the clubs: Internacional, Guarani, Grêmio Foot-Ball Porto Alegrense, Juventude, Santos, Glória de Vacaria-RS, Vitória, Coritiba.

On 18 August 1994 Daltro Menezes died aged 56.

Honours 
 Internacional
 Campeonato Gaúcho: 1969, 1970, 1971

References

External links

1938 births
1994 deaths
Sportspeople from Porto Alegre
Brazilian football managers
Campeonato Brasileiro Série A managers
Campeonato Brasileiro Série B managers
Sport Club Internacional managers
Guarani FC managers
Grêmio Foot-Ball Porto Alegrense managers
Associação Olímpica de Itabaiana managers
Esporte Clube Juventude managers
Criciúma Esporte Clube managers
Coritiba Foot Ball Club managers
Ceará Sporting Club managers
Santos FC managers
Esporte Clube Vitória managers
Esporte Clube Novo Hamburgo managers
Futebol Clube Santa Cruz managers
Grêmio Esportivo Glória managers
Figueirense FC managers
Ypiranga Futebol Clube managers